Jakob Jarrod Naran Patel Bhula (born 12 December 1999) is a New Zealand cricketer. Bhula was born to an Indian Gujarati family on 12 December 1999 in Wellington, New Zealand.

Career
He made his List A debut for Wellington in the 2018–19 Ford Trophy on 24 October 2018. Prior to his List A debut, he was named in New Zealand's squad for the 2018 Under-19 Cricket World Cup. During the tournament, he scored 180 runs against Kenya, the highest individual total in all Under-19 World Cups.

He made his first-class debut for Wellington in the 2018–19 Plunket Shield season on 6 December 2018. He made his Twenty20 debut on 6 January 2022, for Wellington in the 2021–22 Super Smash.

References

External links
 

1999 births
Living people
New Zealand cricketers
Wellington cricketers
Cricketers from Wellington City
New Zealand sportspeople of Indian descent